Polk Street Concrete Cottage Historic District is a national historic district located in the First Subdivision of Gary, Indiana.  The district encompasses four contributing buildings in a residential section of Gary. The buildings were designed by D. F. Creighton and built by the United States Sheet & Tin Plate Co. They were built starting in 1910 and are examples of the Edison Concept Houses that were designed, patented, and promoted by inventor Thomas Edison. The houses reflect Bungalow / American Craftsman design elements.

It was listed in the National Register of Historic Places in 2011.

References

Historic districts on the National Register of Historic Places in Indiana
Houses on the National Register of Historic Places in Indiana
Houses completed in 1910
Historic districts in Gary, Indiana
National Register of Historic Places in Gary, Indiana